Musick to Insult Your Intelligence By is a Green Jellÿ album, originally scheduled to be released on September 29, 2009.  The release date was pushed back to October 13, 2009. It is the fifth LP the band has released, and their first studio album in 15 years since the release of 333 in 1994. It was released through Rotten Records, as Green Jellÿ's original distributor, Zoo Entertainment, folded in 1997. Green Jellÿ founder Bill Manspeaker and most of the original line up from Cereal Killer and 333 perform on this album. It was originally recorded in 1995.

Track listing

References 

2009 albums
Green Jellÿ albums